Mahendra Highway, also called East-West Highway runs across the Terai geographical region of Nepal, from Mechinagar in the east to Bhim Datta in the west, cutting across the entire width of the country. It is the longest highway in Nepal and was constructed by cooperation of various countries.

Overview
The highway is mostly a single lane in each direction. It is a major infrastructure element because east–west travel was previously limited to the Hulaki Highway built during the Rana regime, expensive and limited air travel, or Nepalese trains and buses. Connecting Nepal from Kakarbhitta (Mechinagar Municipality) to West Mahendra Nagar in the east, this is the longest highway in Nepal till now. Bharatpur city and Chitwan valley are located towards the central part of this highway.

The major destinations along and around the highway are Mechinagar, Bhadrapur, Itahari, Janakpur, Bharatpur, Butwal, Siddharthanagar, Nepalganj, and Bhim Dutta. Other towns on the Mahendra Highway are Birtamod, Damak, Inaruwa, Lahan, Narayangadh, Bardibas, and Chisapani

South of the highway are five official border crossing points between Nepal and India. The highway spans over 500 bridges.

Infrastructure in Nepal remains neglected despite the very few "highways" that exist. The busiest highways, including Prithivi Highway, all suffer from heavy traffic.

The highway runs through all the provinces of Nepal except Karnali Province .Mahendra Highway touches all the districts of Terai out of the 20 districts except Parsa. It also touches 2 mountainous districts Arghakhanchi and Makwanpur.

The Highway is currently a part of United Nation’s Asian Highway (AH) project.

History 
Earlier, the highway connecting the east-west region was only limited to postal highway during the Rana period. However, this highway was not a full paved or black topped road. It was only limited till Rapti river in the west and did not include the 4 western districts of Banke, Bardiya, Kailali and Kanchanpur which were famously known as Naya Muluk. Nepalese were compelled to travel via Indian territory while visiting from one district to another district be it in Chitwan or Naya Muluk due to dense forested region as well as north-south sans bridges. It was precisely to end this dependence on India that King Mahendra initiated the idea for an east-west highway, after whom the it is now named. Due to lack of enough budget it was constructed with economic and technical assistance from various countries. King Mahendra had initially requested India to build this highway. However, when India refused, they sought the help of the Soviet Union. India was also attracted after the road from Dhalkebar to Pathalaiya was built by Soviet Union. Similarly, the section from Mechi-Dhalkebar (Jhapa to Janakpur) was constructed by India, while the Hetauda-Narayanghat section was constructed by USA Aid through Asian Development Bank and the Narayanghat-Butwal section by the United Kingdom. Lastly, the Butwal-Kohalpur section was constructed by India. In 1961, King Mahendra laid the foundation stone for the construction of the Highway at Gaidakot. The highway was later named Mahendra Highway in honor of King Mahendra. The highway has greatly contributed to the all round socio-economic development of the country. The highway project started in 1961 and the whole highway was finally finished in 2000 when the westernmost section of the highway was completed. Currently, the highway is being expanded to four lanes.

Route (east to west)

Mechinagar (Kakarbhitta) to Dhalkebar 
This section of the highway was built with Economic assistance from government of India. The construction began in 1966 and was completed in 1971. Mechinagar, in south-eastern Nepal, is on the Nepal-India border. The wide Mechi River, a tributary of the Mahananda River, forms the border.

west of Mechinagar are the junctions for routes to Ilam at Charali and for Bhadrapur at Birtamod. Itahari is the road junction, with Biratnagar, on the Nepal-India border, to the south and Dharan and Dhankuta to the north.

The Mahendra Highway passes over the Barrage between Bhardaha and Bhantabari. Koshi Tappu Wildlife Reserve is easily accessible from the Mahendra Highway.

Dhalkebar to Hetauda 
The Mahendra Highway continues its westward course through the Terai landscape. It crosses the Balan Nadi  before Janakpur junction, and another  later, the Kamla Nadi river.

Hindu mythology identifies Janakpur as the capital of the ancient kingdom of Mithila.

At bardibas, the Highway meets with BP highway which is currently the shortest route to connect Kathmandu with the terai region.

At Pathlaiya, Mahendra Highway reaches the Tribhuvan Highway near the Indian border at Raxaul/Birganj 30 km to the south. The two highways join to cross the Siwalik Range to Hetauda in Chitwan Valley. The 109 Km Dhalkebar- Pathlaiya section of the road in this highway was built by soviet Union while the Pathlaiya - Hetauda Section being part of the Tribhuvan highway was already built completed by India in 1956 however was only handed over to Nepal government in 1965.

Hetauda to Narayanghat
At Hetauda's Buddha Chowk the two highways, Mahendra and Tribhuvan, diverge and the Mahendra Highway heads west towards Narayanghat. This section of road was built with the aid from Asian Development Bank. The highway crossed Tikauli forest to connect Bharatpur with Ratnanagar. The section meets with Madan Ashrit highway connecting Mungling at Narayanghat chowk.The section ends at the Narayanghat river Bridge.

Narayanghat to Butwal 
This section of the road was built with the economic aid from United Kingdom. Butwal is on the west bank of the Tilottama River in the shadow of the Churia Hills. Butwal is the junction of the Highway with the Siddhartha Highway, that connects to Siddharthanagar, Sunauli, Maharajganj, on the Nepal-India border to the south and Pokhara to the north. It Passes through Nawalparasi district where lies the midpoint of the highway. The section ends at Lakhan Thapa chowk in Butwal.

Butwal to Kohalpur 
Similar to Jhapa-Janakpur section, this section was also built with economic assistance of India. However this section was only agreed after the eastern section was completed. The construction began in 1972 and completed in 1976. The section starts from Mahendra Chowk towards West of Butwal. The highway turns north to cross the Dudhwa Hills (350m ascent) into Inner-Terai Deukhuri Valley, then crosses the West Rapti River, which has no relation to the East Rapti River of Chitwan. Just beyond the river (291 km from Hetauda), the highway reaches Bhalubang, where a spur road continues north into Pyuthan and Rolpa districts. The Mahendra Highway heads west again, following the Rapti downstream through Deukhuri. 27 km west of Bhalubang at Lamahi, a spur road goes north to Dang Valley, Dang Airport, and Tulsipur town. 35 km beyond Lamahi, Rapti Highway departs north for Salyan and Rukum districts.

Kohalpur to Mahakali 
Kohalpur, 428 km west of Hetauda, is the junction for highway south  to Nepalganj and the border with India and north to Birendranagar in Surkhet. From Kohalpur the highway passes the Kusum-Ilaka forest, which is being eyed as a potential extension area of Bardia National Park, which lies to the north-west of Nepalganj, on the Nepal-India border. Crossing the Karnali River at Chisapani, the highway continues west to the Indian border at Bhim Datta on the Mahakali River, crossing on a barrage. The section between Chisapani and Bhim Datta is in poor repair. There is a  extension to Banbasa, the first town in Uttarakhand, India. Moreover, Mahendranagar-Tanakpur Link Road connects at Mahendranagar connects the town of  Mahendranagar to the Tanakpur Barrage from the Highway. There are a total of 22 bridges in this section for which construction started in 1996 and ended in 2000.

Major junctions

The major junctions of Mahendra Highway are:

 Charali – Junction with Mechi Highway with Chandragadhi-Bhadrapur to south and Ilam-Panchthar-Taplejung to the north.
Itahari –  Junction with the Koshi Highway with Jogbani- Biratnagar to the south and Dharan and Dhankuta to the north.
Bardibas - The starting point of BP Highway, an alternative roadway to Kathmandu.
Hetauda – Major junction with Tribhuvan Highway with Birganj in the south and Kathmandu and Prithvi Highway to the north.
Bharatpur – Link to Mugling on the Prithvi Highway
Butwal – Junction of Siddhartha Highway with Sunauli and Lumbini to the south and Tansen and Pokhara to the north.
Lamahi - The starting point of Lamahi-Ghorai-Tulsipur road.
Various minor district road junctions at all districts it passes through.

References

Highways in Nepal
History of Nepal (1951–2008)